Erritsø GIF Rugby is a Danish rugby club in the Erritsø suburb of Fredericia. The club forms part of the Erritsø Gymnastik- & Idrætsforening (Gymnastics and Sports Club)

History
The club was founded in 1984.

External links
Erritsø GIF Rugby

Rugby clubs established in 1984
Danish rugby union teams
Fredericia Municipality